Dahlonega is the county seat of Lumpkin County, Georgia, United States. As of the 2010 census, the city had a population of 5,242, and in 2018 the population was estimated to be 6,884.

Dahlonega is located at the north end of Georgia highway 400, a freeway which connects Dahlonega to Atlanta. Dahlonega was named as one of the best places to retire by the publication Real Estate Scorecard.

Dahlonega was the site of the first major Gold Rush in the United States beginning in 1829.  The Dahlonega Gold Museum Historic Site which is located in the middle of the public square, was originally built in 1836 as the Lumpkin County Courthouse.  In 1849, when local gold miners were considering heading west to join the California Gold Rush,  Dr. Matthew Fleming Stephenson, the assayer at the Dahlonega Branch Mint,  tried to persuade miners to stay in Dahlonega.    Standing on the courthouse balcony and pointing at the distant Findley Ridge, Dr. Stephenson was recalled in his speech as saying: "Why go to California?  In yonder hill lies more riches than anyone ever dreamed of. There's millions in it,"   This phrase was repeated by those miners who did make the journey to California and was shared in the mining camps of the west.  Years later, the young Samuel Clemons better known as the author Mark Twain, also heard of Stephenson's phrase.  Twain was so enthralled by the phrase "There's Millions In It," that used it frequently in his book The Gilded Age.   Over time, the phrase has been misquoted to the more well known "Thar's gold in them thar hills."

The Georgia Gold Rush 
In 1829, the first documented discovery of gold was made in Georgia.  As news of the discovery spread, thousands of would be get rich quick men flooded into the mountains looking for the yellow metal in the creeks and rivers.  At that time in history, the frontier of Georgia bordered the Cherokee Nation.  During the winter of 1829-1830, white gold prospectors began illegally crossing the Chestatee River into the Cherokee Nation in search of gold.   After objections were made to the Federal Indian Agent in the territory, United States troops were sent in to forcibly remove the gold miners from the nation.

By 1831, Governor Gilmer (and later Wilson Lumpkin) of Georgia realized that it was impossible to remove the thousands of miners who had intruded into the Cherokee Nation.  Gilmer saw an opportunity to claim the remaining Cherokee lands as part of Georgia.  In 1832, the Georgia legislature voted to create ten new counties out of the former Cherokee Nation without regard to their sovereignty.   Lumpkin County named after Governor Wilson Lumpkin, was created in December 1832.  A year later the town of Taloneka or Talonega was named as the new county seat on December 21st, 1833.  The spelling was later changed to 

Dahlonega, derived from the Cherokee word meaning "yellow." 

The spelling of the Cherokee word Da-lo-ni-ge-i was disputed by early correspondents; Featherstonhough, for example, wrote it as "Tahlonekay". The proper pronunciation of Dahlonega is (Dah-loe-nee-gee or Dah-lone-gay) in the Western Dialect of the Cherokee language. Da-lo-ni-ge'i does not mean gold but it simply means, Yellow.

Naming the city 

The city was named "Talonega" by the Georgia General Assembly on December 21, 1833. The name was changed from Talonega by the Georgia General Assembly on December 25, 1837 to "Dahlonega", from the Cherokee-language word Dalonige, meaning "yellow" or "gold".

The Dahlonega Branch Mint 
 
Due to the abundance of gold which was discovered in North Georgia, the United States Treasury Department decided to build a branch mint in Dahlonega.  This allowed local miners a place to bring their gold deposits in exchange for hard currency.  The Dahlonega branch mint was built in 1838 and operated from 1838 to 1861.  The Dahlonega Mint, like the one also established in 1838 in Charlotte, North Carolina, minted only gold coins, in denominations of $1.00, $2.50 (quarter eagle), $3.00 (1854 only) and $5.00 (half eagle). It was cost-effective in consideration of the economics, time, and risk of shipping gold to the main mint in Philadelphia, Pennsylvania. The Dahlonega Mint was a small operation, usually accounting for only a small fraction of the gold coinage minted annually in the US.

In 1861, when the Civil War began, the mint closed due to lack of materials and manpower.   After the war the U.S. government decided against re-opening the facility.   By then, the U.S. government had established a mint in San Francisco. Given the large amount of gold discovered in California from the late 1840s on, the San Francisco and Philadelphia mints handled the national needs of coin minting.  As a result, surviving Dahlonega coinage is today highly prized in American numismatics.   

The University of North Georgia

After the end of the Civil War in 1865, the Dahlonega Branch mint remained closed.  The building served as a barracks for US troops garrisoned here, and as a school for freed black students.  In 1871, Hon. William P. Price, who had been elected to congress from Dahlonega, petitioned the government to re-purpose the vacant mint building into a college.  In 1873, the newly founded North Georgia Agricultural College, opened its doors from the ashes of the original Dahlonega Branch Mint.  Over the years as the college grew, the names have changed from the original North Georgia Agricultural College, North Georgia College, North Georgia College and State University and the current designation as the University of North Georgia.

Wine and tourism 
In recent years, Dahlonega and Lumpkin County have been recognized as "the heart of the North Georgia Wine Country". The county features multiple vineyards and five licensed wineries that attract many tourists.

The historic Dahlonega Square is a popular destination, with gift shops, restaurants, art galleries and studios, and wine-tasting rooms. In 2015, Senator Steve Gooch introduced Georgia Senate Resolution 125 officially recognizing Lumpkin County as the Wine Tasting Room Capital of Georgia.

The city's local festivals draw many visitors. "Bear on the Square", an annual three-day festival held the third weekend in April, marks the day that a black bear wandered onto the square. It features bluegrass and old-time music. "Gold Rush Days", an annual two-day event the third weekend in October, attracts over 200,000 people.

Dahlonega is home to the Holly Theatre.

Historical marker
Located at 384 Mountain Drive, WPA Historical Marker 19 B-7 explains:

This court house, built in 1836, replaced the small structure used since the establishment of Lumpkin County in 1832. The town was named Dahlonega in October, 1833, for the Cherokee word Talonega meaning "golden."

From its steps in 1849, Dr. M.F. Stephenson, assayer at the Mint, attempted to dissuade Georgia miners from leaving to join the California Gold Rush. His oration gave rise to the sayings: "There's millions in it," and "Thar's gold in them thar hills."

Geography
Dahlonega is located in central Lumpkin County at  (34.5325, −83.9850). U.S. Route 19 passes through the east side of the city, leading north  to Blairsville and south  to Atlanta. State Routes 9 and 52 run concurrently around the south side of Dahlonega, joining US 19 on the southeast side. State Route 9 leads southwest  to Dawsonville, while State Route 52 leads west  to Amicalola Falls State Park. To the east State Route 52 leads  to Clermont.

The city is centered on a low ridge, with the west side draining to Cane Creek and the east side to Yahoola Creek. Both creeks flow south to the Chestatee River, part of the Chattahoochee River watershed. Crown Mountain is in the southern part of the city.

Demographics

2020 census

As of the 2020 United States census, there were 7,537 people, 1,873 households, and 1,086 families residing in the city.

2010 census
As of the census of 2010, there were 5,242 people and 2,392 households. The racial makeup of the city was 91.3% White, 3.1% African American, 0.04% Native American, 1.2% Asian, 0.2% Pacific Islander, 2.0% from other races, and 1.9% from two or more races. Hispanic or Latino people of any race were 6.0% of the population.

There were 1,060 households, out of which 23.4% had children under the age of 18 living with them, 41.1% were married couples living together, 9.3% had a female householder with no husband present, and 46.4% were non-families. 31.5% of all households were made up of individuals, and 10.9% had someone living alone who was 65 years of age or older. The average household size was 2.31 and the average family size was 2.96.

In the city, the population was spread out, with 13.5% under the age of 18, 42.9% from 18 to 24, 19.0% from 25 to 44, 13.2% from 45 to 64, and 11.4% who were 65 years of age or older. The median age was 22 years. For every 100 females, there were 73.6 males. For every 100 females age 18 and over, there were 69.3 males.

The median income for a household in the city was $28,636, and the median income for a family was $44,904. Males had a median income of $30,500 versus $22,917 for females. The per capita income for the city was $16,572. About 11.4% of families and 24.4% of the population were below the poverty line, including 19.4% of those under age 18 and 13.8% of those age 65 or over.

Education

Lumpkin County School District 
The Lumpkin County School District holds pre-school to grade twelve, and consists of three elementary schools, a middle school, and a high school. The district has 215 full-time teachers and over 3,511 students.
Lumpkin County Elementary School
Long Branch Elementary School
Blackburn Elementary School
Lumpkin County Middle School
Lumpkin County High School

Higher education 
Dahlonega is home to University of North Georgia (formerly named North Georgia College and State University), North Georgia College and North Georgia Agricultural College, the Senior Military College of Georgia and the second oldest public university in the State of Georgia. The University of North Georgia is one of six senior military colleges (along with the Public Campuses of Texas A&M University, the Citadel, the Virginia Military Institute and Virginia Tech, and the Private Campus of Norwich University). The campus' administration building, Price Memorial Hall, is topped with a spire covered with gold leaf from the town. The rotunda dome of the Georgia State Capitol in Atlanta is also covered with Dahlonega gold.

Other educational facilities 
 Wahsega 4-H Center, an environmental education center and summer camp owned by the University of Georgia and administered through the UGA Cooperative Extension Service Georgia 4-H program
 Camp Glisson, a year-round retreat camp owned by the North Georgia Conference of the United Methodist Church

Residents
Sara Christian, NASCAR's first female driver 
Steve Gooch, Georgia state senator and majority whip
Dallas Kinney, Pulitzer Prize-winning photographer
Guy A. J. LaBoa, lieutenant general in the United States Army who commanded the 4th Infantry Division and First United States Army

In popular culture
There is a Dahlonega Mine Train roller coaster at Six Flags over Georgia.

Corey Smith has a song titled "Dahlonega", in reference to the town and its landmarks, on his album While the Gettin' Is Good, released on June 23, 2015.

Country music recording artist Ashley McBryde directly references the town in her debut single "A Little Dive Bar in Dahlonega", which was released in October 2017.

International relations

Twin towns – sister cities
Dahlonega is twinned with:
 Myślenice, Poland

References

Further reading
"Gold-Mining in Georgia." Harper's New Monthly Magazine 59, Issue 352 (September 1879): 517–519. Available here
I Remember Dahlonega: Memories of Growing Up in Lumpkin County, by Anne Dismukes Amerson (Chestatee Publishing: 1993)

Williams, David, "'Such Excitement You Never Saw': Gold Mining in Nineteenth-Century Georgia", The Georgia Historical Quarterly, Vol. 76, No. 3 (Fall 1992), pp. 695–707, Georgia Historical Society. Article Stable URL: https://www.jstor.org/stable/40582597

External links

City of Dahlonega official website 
Dahlonega Georgia Merchants Association
The Dahlonega Nugget newspaper
"Thar's Gold in Them Thar Hills": Gold and Gold Mining in Georgia, 1830s–1940s
Bear on the Square Mountain Festival
Dahlonega Wineries 

Cities in Lumpkin County, Georgia
Cities in Georgia (U.S. state)
County seats in Georgia (U.S. state)